Eilema marguerita is a moth of the subfamily Arctiinae. It is found on Sumatra.

References

 Natural History Museum Lepidoptera generic names catalog

marguerita